Red crowberry is a common name for several species of plants in the genus Empetrum bearing red berries, and may refer to:

Empetrum eamesii, native to northeastern North America
Empetrum rubrum, native to the Falkland Islands and southern South America